Raymond Detrez (Antwerp 1948) is Professor of East European history and cultures and modern Greek history at the University of Ghent, Belgium.

Biography 
He has studied Eastern European languages and history at the University of Ghent (1967–71) and specialised in Bulgarian philology at the University of Sofia (1971). For around two decades, he worked as a producer of the Belgian Radio and then became a professor of Eastern European history and culture. In 1986, he received his Ph.D. with a thesis on the autobiography of Grigor Parlichev. Detrez has published books and articles on 19th and 20th century Balkan history, minority questions and nationalism. From 2000 until his retirement in 2013, he was a director of the Centre of Southeast European studies at the University of Ghent and also taught at the Catholic University of Leuven. Detrez has conducted research mainly into three areas: historical approaches to pre-national collective identities on the Balkans; linguistic approaches to national identity on the Balkans and the image of Eastern Europe in the West and vice versa in literature and culture.

Publications 
 Burenruzie op de Balkan. Minderhedenproblemen in Zuidoost-Europa. Utrecht: Oost-Europa Projecten, 1988
 De Balkan. Van burenruzie tot burgeroorlog. Antwerpen: Hadewijch, 1992. 
 Grigor Părličev.  Een case study in Balkan-nationalisme. Antwerpen:  Restant, 19 (1992), nr. 2.
 De sloop van Joegoslavië. Het relaas van een boedelscheiding. Antwerpen: Hadewijch, 1996. 
 Historical Dictionary of the Republic of Bulgaria. Metuchen, N. J., & London: The Scarecrow Press, Inc., 1997. (2006) 
 Kosovo. De uitgestelde oorlog. Antwerpen: Hadewych, 1998 (1999) 
 Bulgarije. Amsterdam: KIT, 2000. (2007) 
 Криволици на мисълта. Прев. Жерминал Чивиков. София: ЛИК, 2001. 
 Bulgarije: Mensen, Politiek, Economie, Cultuur, Milieu, 2000. 
 Macedonie: Mensen, Politiek, Economie, Cultuur, Milieu, 2001. 
 Macedonië - land in de wachtkamer. Antwerpen: Hadewych, 2002.
 Servie-Montenegro: Mensen, Politiek, Economie, Cultuur, Milieu. Koninklijk Instituut voor de Tropen, 2003. 
 Developing cultural identity in the Balkans: convergence vs divergence. Detrez, R. & Plas, P. (eds), Peter Lang, 2005. 
 Косово. Отложената независимост. Прев. Анета Данчева-Манолова. София: Кралица Маб, 2008. . 
 Rusland een geschiedenis. Pandora Pockets, 2008. 
 Europe and the Historical Legacies in the Balkans. Detrez, R. & B. Segaert (eds.) Brussels: P.I.E. Peter Lang, 2008. 
 Centraal-Europa: een geschiedenis. Houtekiet, 2013. 
 Не търсят гърци, а ромеи да бъдат. Православната културна общност в Османската империя. XV – ХІХ в., София: Кралица Маб, 2015.

Notes

External links
 Curriculum UGent
 Curriculum K.U.Leuven
 

Belgian historians
1948 births
Living people
Historians of modern Greece
Historians of Bulgaria